Merano Cup is an annual figure skating competition held in Merano, Italy. Inaugurated in 1997, it is typically held around November. Medals are awarded in the disciplines of men's and ladies' singles on the senior, junior, and novice levels. It was held as a club competition in its early years.

Senior medalists

Men

Ladies

Pairs

Junior medalists

Men

Ladies

Pairs

Advanced novice medalists

Men

Ladies

References

External links
 Ice Club Merano
 2004 Merano Cup
 15th Merano Cup

 
International figure skating competitions hosted by Italy